Endothelial zinc finger protein induced by tumor necrosis factor alpha is a protein that in humans is encoded by the ZNF71 gene.

References

Further reading